Ioan Slavici (18 January 1848 – 17 August 1925) was a Romanian writer and journalist from Hungary, later from Romania.

He made his debut in Convorbiri literare ("Literary Conversations") (1871), with the comedy Fata de birău ("The Mayor's Daughter"). Alongside Mihai Eminescu he founded the Young Romania Social and Literary Academic Society and organized, in 1871, the Putna Celebration of the Romanian Students from Romania and from abroad. At the end of 1874, he settled in Bucharest, where he became secretary of the Hurmuzachi Collection Committee, then he became a professor, and then an editor of the newspaper Timpul ("The Time"). Alongside Ion Luca Caragiale and George Coșbuc, he edited the Vatra ("The Hearth") magazine. During World War I, he collaborated at the newspapers Ziua ("The Day") and Gazeta Bucureștilor ("The Bucharest Gazette"). He was awarded the Romanian Academy Award (1903).

Early life

Slavici was born in the village of Világos (today Șiria, Romania), near Arad, in 1848, the revolutionary year throughout Europe, with ramifications in Transylvania (then part of the Austrian Empire). Until 1868, Slavici studied at the local Orthodox school and various other institutions in Hungary, being taught in either Hungarian or German.

When he finished his studies, Slavici left the Tiszántúl region for Budapest, where he intended to study law. The following year, however, financial difficulties forced him to return home and take a job as a notary public. Throughout his employment, Slavici saved the money that would help him continue his studies.

Junimea

In 1871, he left for Vienna as part of his military service. This proved to be a decisive moment in the life of the future writer, as Slavici had a chance to meet Mihai Eminescu, the most important Romanian poet, who was studying at the University of Vienna. The two became good friends, with Eminescu encouraging and assisting Slavici in the development of his style and of the works themselves. The same year marked Slavici's literary debut in Convorbiri Literare, the mouthpiece of the Junimea society in Iași.

In 1872, Slavici again had to interrupt his studies because of financial difficulties. Two years later, he left Austria-Hungary and moved to Iași, where he took part in the Junimea gatherings. In 1874 the Ioan Slavici Classical Theatre was established in Arad.  His first book, Nuvele din popor, a collection of short stories, was published in 1881. It included Moara cu noroc (The Lucky Mill) and Budulea Taichii, two of Slavici's best-known and crafted works.

Prisons and return to Romania
In 1882, he was selected as a corresponding member of the Romanian Academy. In 1884, Slavici moved to Transylvania, becoming actively involved in the Romanian national movement, serving as a member of the Central Committee of the Romanian National Party, the main political forum of Romanians in the region. Hungarian authorities sentenced Slavici to one year in prison for his nationalist stance. This was the first of many short stays in prison in Slavici's life (not all of them connected with his political attitudes – some were the outcome of lawsuits against other journalists).

Six years later, he moved to Bucharest and, in 1894, he began publishing the first parts of his most famous novel, Mara, which was published as a single volume 12 years later. This is also the period of his activities as editor of Vatra magazine, alongside George Coșbuc and Ion Luca Caragiale.

World War I and later years
In 1909, Slavici began work for the pro-German newspaper Ziua. With the outbreak of World War I, his writings at the newspaper brought him into conflict with other intellectuals who supported the Triple Entente powers. On 14 August 1916, Romania entered the War on the Entente side, attacking Hungary in Transylvania. After a successful German and Austro-Hungarian counterattack, Romania had most of its territory (including Bucharest) occupied by the German, Austro-Hungarian, and Bulgarian troops in the summer of 1917.

The Romanian legitimate government took refuge in Iași, with the Central Powers establishing a puppet administration for the occupied lands. Slavici collaborated with the new government, being employed as editor of the official journal, the Bucharest Gazette. After the German withdrawal in November 1918, he was put on trial for his wartime activities and spent one year in jail, while his reputation with the intelligentsia was tarnished.

In 1925 Slavici went to stay with his daughter in Panciu (a town now in Vrancea County). He died there later that year, and was buried at the hermitage within .

Antisemitism
In contrast to the Junimea leadership (but consistent with the attitudes expressed by some of the group's members), Slavici was a noted antisemite. His early definition of Jews as "a disease" was doubled by his arguments in favor of their violent expulsion from Romanian soil:
"The solution that remains for us is, at a signal, to close the borders, to annihilate them, to throw them into the Danube right up to the very last of them, so that nothing remain of their seed!"
Later on, Slavici considered that:
"The hatred that has welled up against these people is natural, and this hatred can easily be unleashed against all of them that have inherited wealth or acquired it themselves, and could lead at the end to a horrible shedding of blood."

Legacy
The Ioan Slavici Classical Theatre in Arad and the Ioan Slavici National College in Satu Mare are named in his honor. Streets in Arad, Baia Mare, Bistrița, Satu Mare, Suceava, and Timișoara also bear his name.

Works

Theatre
Comedy
 Fata de birău (1871)
 Toane sau Vorbe de clacă (1875)
 Polipul unchiului (1875)
 Drama
 Bogdan Vodă (1876)
 Gaspar Graziani (1888)

Fairy tales
 "Zâna Zorilor", in English "The fairy Aurora"
 ""
 "Doi feți cu stea în frunte", in English "The twins with the golden star"
 "Păcală în satul lui"
 "Spaima zmeilor"
 "Rodul tainic"
 "Ileana cea șireată"
 "Ioanea mamei"
 "Petrea prostul"
 "Limir-împărat"
 "Băiet sărac"
 "Împăratul șerpilor"
 "Doi frați buni"
 "Băiat sărac și horopsit"
 "Nărodul curții"
 "Negru împărat"
 "Peștele pe brazdă"
 "Stan Bolovan"
 "Boierul și Păcală"

Novellas
  (1873) 
 Scormon (1875)
 La crucea din sat (1876)
 Crucile roșii (1876)
 O viață pierdută (1876)
  (1878)
 Budulea Taichii (1880)
 Moara cu noroc (The Mill of Good Luck, 1880)
  (1884)
 Comoara (1896)
 Vatra părăsită (1900)
 La răscruci (1906)
 Pascal, săracul (1920)

Novels
  (1894)
 Din bătrâni (1902)
 Din bătrâni. Manea (1905):)
 Corbei (1906)
 Din două lumi (1920)
 Cel din urmă armaș (1923)
 Din păcat în păcat (1924)

Memoires
 Fapta omenească. Scrisori adresate unui tânăr (1888–1889)
 Serbarea de la Putna (1903)
 Închisorile mele (1920)
 Amintiri (1924)
 Lumea prin care am trecut (1924)

References

External links
Works

 
"Popa Tanda", in Roumanian Stories, trans. Lucy Byng, John Lane, The Bodley Head, London, 1921, pp. 175–205
Biographical
Ioan Slavici, timeline.
The Report of the International Committee for the Study of Holocaust in Romania (on the Romanian Presidency site), a review of Romanian Anti-Semitic stances (in English)

1848 births
1925 deaths
Austro-Hungarian emigrants to Romania
Ethnic Romanian politicians in Transylvania
People from Arad County
Junimists
Corresponding members of the Romanian Academy
Romanian magazine editors
Romanian newspaper editors
Romanian novelists
Romanian male novelists
Romanian male short story writers
Romanian short story writers
Romanian people of World War I
Romanian notaries
Members of the Romanian Orthodox Church
Romanian prisoners and detainees
Prisoners and detainees of Romania
Antisemitism in Romania